Martin J. Verhoeven (born December 2, 1946) is an American scholar, translator, and former Buddhist monk. He is a senior disciple of Hsuan Hua, and currently serves as dean of academics at Dharma Realm Buddhist University. He has previously served as adjunct professor at the Graduate Theological Union and as a lecturer at the University of California at Berkeley. He is best known for completing a three steps one bow pilgrimage with companion Heng Sure. During this pilgrimage Verhoeven and Heng Sure bowed from South Pasadena to Ukiah, California, a distance of 800 miles, over the course of two years and six months.

Education 
Verhoeven completed his BA in 1969, his MA in 1971, and his PhD in 1997, all at the University of Wisconsin-Madison.

Career 
In 1976, Verhoeven met and trained under the Buddhist teacher Hsuan Hua. He became a monk (under the name Heng Chau) that same year, and undertook a two-year bowing pilgrimage with fellow monk, Heng Sure.

Selected publications 
2006: Buddhist Ideas about No-Self and the Person. Religion East & West.

2016: Highway Dharma Letters. Buddhist Text Translation Society.

2014: The Sixth Patriarch’s Dharma Jewel Platform Sutra. Editor, Translator. Buddhist Text Translation Society.

2013: “Science Through Buddhist Eyes,” The New Atlantis, Number 39.

2001: "Glistening Frost and Cooking Sand: Unalterable Aspects of Purity in Chan Buddhist Meditation," in Purity of Heart and Contemplation: A Monastic Dialogue Between Christian and Asian Traditions. Continuum.

2001. “Buddhism and Science: Probing the Boundaries of Faith and Reason,” Religion East and West, Issue 1.

1998: "Americanizing the Buddha," in The Faces of Buddhism in America. University of California Press.

References

University of California, Berkeley faculty
American Buddhist monks
1946 births
Living people
Dharma Realm Buddhist Association
University of Wisconsin–Madison alumni